Norrent-Fontes is a commune in the Pas-de-Calais department in the Hauts-de-France region of France.

Geography
The A26 autoroute passes through the commune.

History
Known to the Romans as Norremum, later as Norrem, in 1211 and then Norrenc in 1240. The hamlet of Fontes was known as Adfondenis in 654. After the French Revolution, the commune was created from the village of Norrent and the three hamlets of Fontes, Goulay and Malznoi. 
Between the two world wars, the commune was home to one of the biggest military airfields in northern France. Abandoned in 1940, the site was reused by the Germans to launch V1 missiles towards London, in 1944. The remains are still visible from the Rely road.

Population

Places of interest
 The church of St. Vaast, dating from the sixteenth century.
 Two old mills and some ancient houses.
 The war memorial.

See also
Communes of the Pas-de-Calais department

References

External links

 Personal website about the commune 
 The war memorial 

Norrentfontes